Greenwood Community High School is a public high school located in Greenwood, Indiana. It is located in a southern suburb of Indianapolis, Indiana.

About
It is composed of more than 1100 students and operates on a seven period day with 45 minutes of instruction in each period.

Athletics 
The Woodmen are members of the Mid-State Conference.

Marching Woodmen 
Greenwood Community High School is known for their marching band which goes by the name "Marching Woodmen". They have won 14 ISSMA State Championships (1986,1987,19891990,1995,1996,1997,2000,2006,2007,2010,2014, and 2018). The Marching Woodman have also marched in the 1993 Philadelphia Thanksgiving Day Parade, the 1997 Fiesta Bowl Parade, and the 2001,2005,2009,20013, and 2017 Hollywood Christmas Parades.

Notable alumni
 A. J. Edds (2006) – Former NFL linebacker
 Andy Chanley – Voice over artist and actor
 Brayton Laster – Racing Driver

See also
 List of high schools in Indiana

References

External links
 Official Website

1954 establishments in Indiana
Educational institutions established in 1954
Public high schools in Indiana
Schools in Johnson County, Indiana